Golgir District is a district (bakhsh) in Masjed Soleyman County, Khuzestan Province, Iran. At the 2006 census, its population was 7,604, in 1,586 families.  The district has two cities: Masjed Soleyman and Golgir. The district has two rural districts (dehestan): Tolbozan Rural District and Tombi Golgir Rural District.

References 

Masjed Soleyman County
Districts of Khuzestan Province